Colton Gromley (born December 26, 1999) is an American tennis player.

Gromley made his ATP main draw debut at the 2019 BB&T Atlanta Open after receiving a wildcard for the singles main draw. 

Gromley plays college tennis for Georgia Tech.

References

External links

1999 births
Living people
People from Norcross, Georgia
Sportspeople from the Atlanta metropolitan area
Tennis people from Georgia (U.S. state)
American male tennis players
Georgia Tech Yellow Jackets men's tennis players